Neopeltidae is a family of sea sponges.

Genera 
Daedalopelta Sollas, 1888
Homophymia Vacelet & Vasseur, 1971
Neopelta Schmidt, 1880
Sollasipelta Van Soest & Hooper, 2020

References
 

Tetractinellida
Taxa named by William Johnson Sollas